"Hey Ho" is the third single from Gin Wigmore's first studio album, Holy Smoke. The song was featured in season 6 finale of Weeds.

Background
"Hey Ho" was co-written by Wigmore and Dan Wilson in Minneapolis, Minnesota. Wigmore said the song was "something dark, some kind of Mexican, Day of the Dead mariachi ... some weird cool shit. So we [Wigmore and Wilson] were just like, 'hey ho'."

Lyrically, Wigmore said "I, being a girl, can be tormenting the man...I just really like that. I guess that's the feminist in me."

"Hey Ho" appeared at the end of the Weeds Season 6 finale, "Theoretical Love Is Not Dead".

Music video

The music video was directed by Moh Azima in Los Angeles, and shooting finished in February 2010. It was released in March 2010.

Track listing

Charts

References

2010 singles
Gin Wigmore songs
2009 songs
Songs written by Dan Wilson (musician)